Henry Dixon Allen (June 24, 1854 – March 9, 1924) was a U.S. Representative from Kentucky.

Born near Henderson, Kentucky, Allen moved with his parents to Morganfield, Union County, in 1855.
He attended the common schools and Morganfield Collegiate Institute.
He taught school in Union County 1869-1875.
He studied medicine and was graduated from the Missouri Medical College, St. Louis, Missouri, in 1877.
Practiced medicine in Union County from 1877 to 1878.
Abandoned medicine and studied law.
He was admitted to the bar in 1878 and commenced practice in Morganfield, Kentucky.
County school commissioner 1879-1881.
He served as prosecuting attorney of Union County 1882-1891.

Allen was elected as a Democrat to the Fifty-sixth and Fifty-seventh Congresses (March 4, 1899 – March 3, 1903).
He was not a candidate for renomination in 1902.
He resumed the practice of law.
He also engaged in banking and agricultural pursuits.
He died in Morganfield, Kentucky, March 9, 1924.
He was interred in Masonic Cemetery.

References

1854 births
1924 deaths
Kentucky lawyers
People from Henderson County, Kentucky
Democratic Party members of the United States House of Representatives from Kentucky
19th-century American lawyers